Meherabad (meher meaning "friend" from Iranian "Mihir", ultimately from Old Persian "Mithra"; abad meaning a prosperous settlement, or a flourishing colony) was originally an ashram established by Meher Baba near Arangaon village, India in 1923 about  south of Ahmednagar. It is now the site of Meher Baba's samadhi (shrine/tomb) as well as facilities and accommodations for pilgrims. Many buildings mostly associated with the earlier decades of Baba’s work, the graves of disciples, and a range of pilgrim accommodation and charitable establishments are also there. Many Baba-lovers work or live in the vicinity. There is also a free dispensary and school.

Established in May 1923, Meherabad was the first permanent residence of Meher Baba and his disciples in Ahmednagar district.

Meher Pilgrim Center (also spelled "Centre") is the central administrative facility for the Meher Baba pilgrim retreat. The Pilgrim Center and Pilgrim Retreat are closed during the hot Indian summer from 15 March to 15 June of each year. On 15 June 2006, new pilgrim facilities were established with the construction of Meher Pilgrim Retreat, an  facility.

References

External links
Historic Meherabad

Populated places established in 1923
Holy cities
Ashrams
Religious places
Meher Baba
Ahmednagar district
Villages in Ahmednagar district